Ataco is a town and municipality located in the Tolima department of Colombia. The population of the municipality was 13,470 in the 2018 census.

The Colombian state has been accused of human rights violations in Ataco.

References
Uribe Hands Colombia's Mining Resources Over to the Multinationals

Municipalities of Tolima Department